Dicliptera aripoensis is a species of plant in the family Acanthaceae which is endemic to Trinidad and Tobago.  The species is only known from the Heights of Aripo, in Trinidad's Northern Range.  It is a branching shrub, 1–1.5 m tall with red flowers about 3 cm long.

The species was described as Diapedium aripoense by American botanist Nathaniel Lord Britton in 1926, based on a collection made by Walter Elias Broadway in 1922.  American botanist Emery Clarence Leonard transferred the species to the genus Dicliptera in 1954.

Conservation status
Although Dicliptera aripoensis is not listed in the IUCN Red List the authors of a 2008 assessment of the endemic plant species of Trinidad and Tobago considered it a critically endangered because it is known from only a single locality, and this area is shrinking or experiencing habitat degradation.

See also
 Endemic flora of Trinidad and Tobago

References

Acanthaceae
Critically endangered plants
Endemic flora of Trinidad and Tobago